Mariza Campos Gomes da Silva (born 19 March 1935) is the widow of 23rd Vice President of Brazil, José Alencar, and served as Second Lady of the country between 2003 and 2010.

Biography
She was born in Minas Gerais on 15 March 1935, son of Luiz Campos de Carvalho. Mariza is Bachelor of Nursing, graduated at Ana Nery Nursing School.

Marriage and children

Mariza met young José Alencar in her own birth town, where they got married on 9 November 1957. They had three children: Maria da Graça, born in 1959; Patrícia, born in 1960; and Josué born in 1963. Patrícia and Josué were born in Rio de Janeiro, but were registered in Ubá.

Second Lady of Brazil

She became Second Lady of the country with the inauguration of her husband as Vice President on 1 January 2003. She kept a discreet image and away from spotlights, appearing only in official solemnity of the government. She kept her role with Lula's reelection in 2006.

Post-Vice Presidency and widowhood
At the end of Alencar's term as Vice President of the Republic in 2010, he presented a delicate state of health. On 22 December 2010, he was submitted to a surgery to try to contain a bleeding in the abdomen, dying on 29 March due to multiple organ failure in consequence of the cancer of the abdominal region. After leaving the Jabiru's Palace and the death of her husband, Mariza became donator of, at least, 50 charity institutions.

References

1935 births
Living people
People from Minas Gerais
Second ladies of Brazil